Woke capitalism is a term coined by columnist Ross Douthat in an article for The New York Times.

By the mid-2010s, language associated with "wokeness" had entered the mainstream media and was being used for marketing. According to The Economist, examples of "woke capitalism" include advertising campaigns designed to appeal to millennials, who often hold more socially liberal views than earlier generations.  These campaigns were often perceived by customers as insincere and inauthentic and provoked backlashes.

In 2020, cultural scientists Akane Kanai and Rosalind Gill described "woke capitalism" as the "dramatically intensifying" trend to include historically marginalized groups (currently primarily in terms of race, gender and religion) as mascots in advertisement with a message of empowerment to signal progressive values. On the one hand, this creates an individualized and depoliticized idea of social justice, reducing it to an increase in self-confidence. On the other hand, the omnipresent visibility in advertising can also amplify a backlash against the equality of precisely these minorities. These would become mascots not only of the companies using them, but of the unchallenged neoliberal economic system with its socially unjust order itself. For the economically weak, the equality of these minorities would thus become indispensable to the maintenance of this economic system; the minorities would be seen responsible for the losses of this system.

The term woke-washing has been used by Alan Jope, the chief executive of Unilever, who warned that brands which failed to take action on their rhetoric could "further destroy trust in our industry".  Helen Lewis holds the opinion that cancel culture is the result of what she calls "the iron law of woke capitalism", and believes that it is used for inexpensive messaging as a substitute for genuine reform. Elizabeth Bruenig's opinion is that that while it has been said to create benefits for the public good, she feels it is nothing to celebrate. Andrew V. Abela holds the opinion that it does little to actually further progressive causes.

See also 

 Managerial state
 Pinkwashing
 Political hip hop
 Social justice warrior

References 

American political catchphrases
Ideologies of capitalism
Political controversies
Social justice terminology